Rathinapuri Ilavarasi is a 1960 Indian Tamil-language film, directed by T. R. Ramanna. The film stars M. R. Radha, T. R. Mahalingam and E. V. Saroja. It was released on 13 April 1960.

Plot 

Nandivarman is a relative of a King. He lives a life of pleasure and was imprisoned for a misdeed. However, he escapes from the prison and roams all over many places. Once he wins a competition and takes possession of a dancer. He also becomes the ruler of a small kingdom and continues his playboy-type living. The rest of the story deals with how he finally meets his deserved end.

Cast 

Male cast
 M. R. Radha
 T. R. Mahalingam
 Ashokan
Ennatha Kannaiya
C. V. V. Panthulu
G. Pattu Iyer
Sayeeram
Balakrishnan
Sathyamoorthy
Natarajan
Swami
T. V. Sedhuraman

Female cast
M. V. Rajamma
E. V. Saroja
Sasi-Kala (Madras Sisters)
Kusalakumari
Padmini Priyadarshini
Gemini Chandra
Jyothi
Mallika
Mohana
C. S. Saroja
Ambika

Production 
The film was produced under the banner Sri Vinayaka Pictures and was directed by T. R. Ramanna. His brother T. K. Rajapathar was in charge of cinematography. Editing was done by M. V. Rajan and M. Durairajan. P. S. Moorthi, Gopalakrishnan and Dandayuthapani pillai were in charge of Choreography. The film was shot at Vijaya-Vauhini and Vikram studios and was processed at Vijaya Laboratory.

Soundtrack 
Music was composed by the duo Viswanathan–Ramamoorthy  and the lyrics were penned by Pattukkottai Kalyanasundaram.

Naraanthakudu (Telugu) Songs

The music was composed by Pamarthi. Lyrics were by Sri Sri.

All the tunes for all the songs for both languages are the same.

References

External links 

1960s Tamil-language films
Films directed by T. R. Ramanna
Films scored by Viswanathan–Ramamoorthy
Indian historical films